Noceda de Rengos is one of 54 parish councils in Cangas del Narcea, a municipality within the province and autonomous community of Asturias, in northern Spain.

Villages
 Cuitada
 La Casería
 Noceda
 Reitornu
 Tresmonte d'Abaxu
 Tresmonte d'Arriba

References

Parishes in Cangas del Narcea